John Prendergast was a priest in Ireland during the late 16th and early 17th centuries: he was Dean of Lismore from 1583 until his resignation in 1610 when he became a prebendary of Cashel.

References

Irish Anglicans
Deans of Lismore